The 2015 AFC Women's Futsal Championship was the first edition of the AFC Women's Futsal Championship, the biennial international futsal championship organized by the Asian Football Confederation (AFC) for the women's national teams of Asia. The tournament was held in Nilai, Malaysia between September 21–26, 2015.

Qualified teams

A total of eight AFC member national teams participated in the tournament. The event invitations were based on participation in the previous two editions of the Asian Indoor and Martial Arts Games (2009 and 2013).

Notes
 were removed from the competition due to a FIFA suspension.
 withdrew before the draw was held.

Venues
All matches were played at the Nilai Indoor Stadium, Nilai.

Draw
The draw was held on 14 July 2015 at the AFC House in Kuala Lumpur, Malaysia. The eight teams were drawn into two groups of four teams (one seeded team and three unseeded teams). Japan and Iran, the champions and runners-up at the 2013 Asian Indoor and Martial Arts Games, were seeded in Pot 1, while all other teams were unseeded in Pot 2.

Group stage
The top two teams of each group advanced to the semi-finals.

Tiebreakers
The teams were ranked according to points (3 points for a win, 1 point for a draw, 0 points for a loss). If tied on points, tiebreakers would be applied in the following order:
Greater number of points obtained in the group matches between the teams concerned;
Goal difference resulting from the group matches between the teams concerned;
Greater number of goals scored in the group matches between the teams concerned;
If, after applying criteria 1 to 3, teams still have an equal ranking, criteria 1 to 3 are reapplied exclusively to the matches between the teams in question to determine their final rankings. If this procedure does not lead to a decision, criteria 5 to 9 apply;
Goal difference in all the group matches;
Greater number of goals scored in all the group matches;
Penalty shoot-out if only two teams are involved and they are both on the field of play;
Fewer score calculated according to the number of yellow and red cards received in the group matches (1 point for a single yellow card, 3 points for a red card as a consequence of two yellow cards, 3 points for a direct red card, 4 points for a yellow card followed by a direct red card);
Drawing of lots.

All times are local, MYT (UTC+8).

Group A

Group B

Knockout stage
In the knockout stage, extra time and penalty shoot-out were used to decide the winner if necessary (no extra time would be used in the third place match).

Bracket

Semi-finals

Third place play-off

Final

Awards

 Most Valuable Player
  Fereshteh Karimi
 Top Scorer Award
  Farahiyah Ridzuan (7 goals, won tiebreaker over  Chikage Kichibayashi)

Goalscorers
7 goals

 Chikage Kichibayashi
 Farahiyah Ridzuan

6 goals

 Fereshteh Karimi

5 goals

 Sara Shirbeigi

4 goals

 Makhliyo Sarikova

3 goals

 Mao Yifan
 Fahimeh Zarei
 Maiko Higashiyama
 Mutsumi Sakata
 Norhawa Yasin
 Mahliyo Yusupova

2 goals

 Liu Jing
 Kwong Wing Yan
 Sepideh Zarrinrad
 Anna Amishiro
 Saori Kato
 Fatin Shahida Azmi
 Hataichanok Tappakun
 Mamyalee Sawitree
 Sasicha Phothiwong
 Siranya Srimanee
 Nguyễn Thị Châu
 Phạm Thị Tươi

1 goal

 Ng Wing Kum
 Wong So Han
 Nasimeh Gholami
 Zohreh Meisami
 Sohila Tarazi
 Kana Kitagawa
 Shiori Nakajima
 Minako Sekinada
 Akari Takao
 Masturah Majid
 Sity Norazizah Jamal
 Nur Shazreen Munazli
 Usliza Usman
 Darika Peanpailun
 Nipaporn Sriwarom
 Feruza Turdiboeva
 Nguyễn Thị Mỹ Anh

1 Own goal

 Wang Hui (playing against Japan)
 Kwong Wing Yan (playing against Malaysia)
 Nur Shazreen Munazli (playing against Thailand)

2 Own goals

 Makhliyo Sarikova (both playing against Iran)

References

External links
, the-AFC.com

 
2015
Women's Futsal Championship
2015
Futsal